The Leningradskoye gas field is a natural gas field located in the Kara Sea (Yamalo-Nenets Autonomous Okrug). It was discovered in around 1980 and is not yet in operation.

References

Natural gas fields in Russia
Natural gas fields in the Soviet Union